Michal Moravčík (born 7 December 1994) is a Czech professional ice hockey player. He is currently playing under contract with Tappara of the Finnish Liiga. He has also played in the Czech Republic and Canada.

Playing career
Moravčík made his debut playing in Czech Extraliga with HC Plzeň during the 2012–13 Czech Extraliga season.

In the 2017–18 season, Moravčík played in 52 games on the blueline for Plzeň, notching personal highs with 5 goals and 16 points and a plus-minus +25 rating. In the post-season he added three goals and 4 assists in 10 playoff games.

On 28 May 2018, Moravčík signed a two-year, entry-level contract with the Montreal Canadiens of the National Hockey League (NHL). After attending the Canadiens training camp, Moravčík was re-assigned to add depth to American Hockey League affiliate, the Laval Rocket for the 2018–19 season. Struggling to adjust to the North American style, he appeared in 20 games with the Rocket recording 3 points, while also experiencing a shortened stint with secondary affiliate the Brampton Beast of the ECHL. Upon his second re-assignment to the Beast, Moravčík was placed on unconditional waivers, opting for a termination of his NHL contract with the Canadiens on January 28, 2019.

As a free agent, Moravčík immediately rejoined his former club HC Plzeň for the remainder of the season, agreeing to an optional multi-year contract on January 30, 2019. He left Plzeň in the middle of the 2019–20 season, moving to HC Litvínov. Alongside countryman Jiří Smejkal, Moravčík joined Finnish side Tappara in May 2020.

Career statistics

Regular season and playoffs

International

References

External links
 

1994 births
Living people
Brampton Beast players
Czech ice hockey defencemen
Laval Rocket players
HC Litvínov players
HC Plzeň players
People from Klatovy
Tappara players
Sportspeople from the Plzeň Region
HC Sparta Praha players
Czech expatriate ice hockey players in Canada
Czech expatriate ice hockey players in Finland